Udanpirappe is a 2021 Indian Tamil-language drama film written and directed by Era. Saravanan. Produced by Suriya and Jyothika via 2D Entertainment, it stars Jyothika, M. Sasikumar and Samuthirakani, in lead roles. The film features music composed by D. Imman, whilst cinematography and editing were handled respectively by R. Velraj and Ruben. It was released for streaming through the digital platform Amazon Prime Video on 14 October 2021. The film received mixed to positive reviews from critics and was also Jyothika's 50th film.

Plot 
Vairavan and Mathangi are loving brother and sister in the village Vengaivasal.

The opening scene starts with kids running and one of them fells into a well and die.

One of the villagers come to Vairavan’s (Sasikumar) house and seeks help as his tractor is missing and says police were disrespectful to him. Vairavan's wife assures him that Vairavan will help. Then we can see hitmen were hired to kill Vairavan. He beats them up for killing a dog without knowing they came to kill him. It is established that Vairavan is a village don and respected wealthy man who does good for everyone in the village. Mathangi and her husband Sargunam, who is a school teacher, are introduced as a loving couple. Sargunam does not speak to Vairavan due to differences in their philosophies. Sargunam believes that everyone must go to court and not practice violence like Vairavan. 

Vairavan’s son Vivek is studying in the US, and when he comes back to visit the village, he meets Sargunam and reprimands him, saying that he does not need his family. In the flashback it is revealed that the two kids which earlier fell in the well were Sargunam’s son and Vivek. Mathangi sees them and jumps to save them. She is not able to save both, and hence, she leaves her own son to save Vivek. Sargunam blames Vairavan for his son’s death as he believes it is his influence that made him fall into the well. Mathangi loves Vairavan and hence vows to make them together and not speak to Vairavan until her husband speaks to him.

Meanwhile, they propose to surge an alliance between the two families through marriage of Vivek to Sargunam’s daughter Keerthana. When the marriage was about to take place, Keerthana is stabbed, and Sargunam blames Vairavan’s violence for it again as neither he or Keerthana has enemies. 

Vairavan deduces that the person who stabbed his niece is Adhiban, who acts like a good man to the villagers but in reality has bad intentions and is a serial sexual assaulter. Vairavan is being searched by police for beating up people. Sargunam provides information to the police on Vairavan’s whereabouts near to Adhiban’s house. Mathangi visits Adhiban’s house and kills him as he tries to molest her. She learns that he also sexually assaulted Keerthana before stabbing her. The reason for stabbing her was Sargunam’s case on his borewell. Vairavan disposes his body off.

Sargunam learns of all this and understands his brother-in-law and the families unite.

Cast 
 Jyothika as Maathangi Sargunam
 M. Sasikumar as Vengaivasal Vairavan
 Samuthirakani as Sargunam Vaathiyaar
 Soori as Pakkadi
 Kalaiyarasan as Adhiban
 Sidhaarth K T as Vivek Vairavan
 Nivedhithaa Sathish as Keerthana Sargunam 
 Sija Rose as Maragathavalli Vairavan
 Vela Ramamoorthy as Maathangi and Vairavan's cousin
 Deepa Shankar as Vairavan's sister-in-law
 Namo Narayana as MLA
 Aadukalam Naren as Peruthulasi
 R. Velraj  as Inspector Rajavel Pandi
 Caravan Arunachalam
 Vengaivaasal Makkal

Production 
Post-completion of Ponmagal Vandhal, Jyothika was reported to act in another production of Suriya's 2D Entertainment. The film, directed by Era. Saravanan of Kaththukutti (2015) fame, began production on 28 November 2019 with M. Sasikumar and Samuthirakani joining the shoot. Jyothika and Sasikumar reportedly played the role of siblings in the film, while Samuthirakani plays Jyothika's husband. Nivedhithaa Sathish essayed the role of Jyothika's daughter in the film. Speaking to The Times of India, Saravanan said it is "a village-based script that throws light on why it’s important to nurture relationships". Composer D. Imman, cinematographer R. Velraj and editor Ruben, also joined the technical crew.

Following the launch ceremony in Chennai, the film began production on 29 November, with shooting took place on Thanjavur and Pudukkottai. The shooting of the film wrapped before March 2020, prior to the COVID-19 lockdown in India, but post-production came to halt and was resumed lately after lockdown relaxations.

Awards and nominations 

JFW Movie Awards for Best Actress - Lead Role for Jyothika	- Nominated
Filmfare Award for Best Actress – Tamil for Jyothika	- Nominated

Music 
D. Imman composed the film's soundtrack. This film marks his first collaboration with Era. Saravanan and Jyothika and third collaboration with Sasikumar after Vetrivel and Kennedy Club. The first single "Anney Yaaranney" was released on 7 October 2021 by Sony Music South and sung by Shreya Ghoshal. Another single "Othapana Kaatteri" was released on 11 October 2021 and sung by Sid Sriram.The lyrics were written by Yugabharathi and Snehan.

Release & Reception 
Udanpirappe was released directly on Amazon Prime Video on 14 October 2021 as a part of 2D Entertainment's four-film deal with the streaming service.

Ranjani Krishankumar of Film Companion wrote, "Grandstanding dialogues, relationships without connections and a convoluted climax sequence make this film barely passable."

References

External links 
 

2020s Tamil-language films
2021 drama films
2021 films
Indian drama films
Amazon Prime Video original films